Mikel Kortina Bertol (born 26 March 1974 in Bilbao, Biscay) is a Spanish retired  footballer who played as a midfielder.

External links

1974 births
Living people
Spanish footballers
Footballers from Bilbao
Association football midfielders
La Liga players
Segunda División players
Segunda División B players
Bilbao Athletic footballers
Athletic Bilbao footballers
SD Eibar footballers
CA Osasuna players
Real Murcia players
UE Lleida players
Spain youth international footballers
Spain under-21 international footballers